Healy is a suburb of Mount Isa in the City of Mount Isa, Queensland, Australia.

Geography 
The Leichhardt River flows north–south through the town of Mount Isa, dividing the suburbs of the town into "mineside" (west of the Leichhardt River) and "townside" (east of the Leichhardt River). Healy is a "townside" suburb.

History 
On 1 September 1973 the suburb was named after Edward Kevin Emmett Healy, Under Secretary in the Queensland Department of Mines.

Healy State School opened on 24 January 1972.

Education 
Healy State School is a government primary (Prep-6) school for boys and girls at 5-9 Thomson Road. In 2016 the school had an enrolment of 163 students (83 of whom identify as Indigenous) with 12 teachers (11 full-time equivalent) and 13 non-teaching staff (10 full-time equivalent). In 2018, the school had an enrolment of 152 students with 12 teachers (11 full-time equivalent) and 11 non-teaching staff (9 full-time equivalent).

There is no secondary school in Healy. The nearest government secondary school is Spinifex State College which has its junior campus in neighbouring Parkside to the north-west and its senior campus in Pioneer to the north-east. However, Spinifex State College does have its residential facility (boarding school) at 83-85 Transmission Street in Healy.

References

External links